Santenay is a commune in the Loir-et-Cher department in central France, located between Château-Renault and Blois.

Population

See also
Communes of the Loir-et-Cher department

References

Communes of Loir-et-Cher